Oktwin Township is a township in Taungoo District in the Bago Region of Burma. The principal town is Oktwin.

References

Townships of the Bago Region
Taungoo District